Mark Scott Sloan (born 14 December 1967) is an English retired footballer. He was born in Wallsend on 14 December 1967. He played as a striker. Since retirement he works as a fireman in Tyneside.

References

External links

NUFC.com

1967 births
Living people
Sportspeople from Wallsend
Footballers from Tyne and Wear
Association football forwards
English footballers
Berwick Rangers F.C. players
Newcastle United F.C. players
Falkirk F.C. players
Cambridge United F.C. players
Hartlepool United F.C. players
Kalmar FF players
Whitley Bay F.C. players
Scottish Football League players
English Football League players
English expatriate footballers
Expatriate footballers in Sweden
English expatriate sportspeople in Sweden